Jeremias III ((c. 1650/1660 – 1735) was Ecumenical Patriarch of Constantinople twice, in 1716–1726 and 1732–1733.

Life
Jeremias was born between 1650 and 1660 in the island of Patmos, where he was ordained deacon. He served as a priest in Halki and then in the Diocese of Caesarea in Cappadocia. When his Metropolitan Cyprianus became Patriarch of Constantinople in 1707, he succeeded him as Metropolitan of Cesarea.

Jeremiah was elected Patriarch for the first time on 23 March 1716. His first patriarchate was long compared to the usual length of his office in that centuries, and Jeremias succeeded to cope with two attempts of deposition, probably sprung from his support to the Russian Tsardom: on 1 January 1718 the Metropolitan of Pruoza, Cyril, was elected Patriarch in his place, but Jeremias returned on the throne next 17 January, and in 1720 he was arrested and his rival, the previous Patriarch Cyril IV, reigned from 10 to 22 January, when Jeremias was re-installed. Jeremiah was finally deposed on 19 November 1726 after his clashes with the ruler of Moldova Grigore II Ghica concerning his refusal to grant divorce to Ghica's brother, and he was exiled to Mount Sinai.

In 1732, Jeremiah returned from exile and on 15 September 1732 he was appointed Patriarch for the second time, but after only a few months, in  March 1733, he had to leave the throne because he suffered of hemiplegia, and he retired in Great Lavra Monastery on Mount Athos, where he died in 1735.

Patriarchate
Asked by the Tsar Peter I of Russia about the validity of the Baptisms celebrated by Protestants, on 31 August 1718 Jeremias confirmed that, as his predecessor Cyprianus stated about the Catholic baptism, it is not necessary to re-baptize the Protestants who joined the Orthodox Church, the Chrismation being enough.

In 1720, he got permission from the Sultan to rebuild a new, larger and brighter Orthodox Patriarchal Cathedral of St. George, destroyed by fire some years before, at the headquarters of the Patriarchate at the Fener. He also reorganized the Monastery of the Transfiguration on the Princes' Islands, which was enriched with a collection of valuable pictures that had been donated by Peter I of Russia.

In December 1723, Jeremias approved the suppression, made in 1721 by Peter I of Russia, of Patriarchate of Moscow and its replacement with the Most Holy Synod.

After that the Melkites of Damascus elected the pro-Westerner Cyril VI Tanas as the new Patriarch of Antioch, Jeremias declared Cyril's election to be invalid, excommunicated him, and appointed the young monk Sylvester as new Patriarch. Jeremias consecrated Sylvester as bishop in Constantinople on October 8, 1724. These events split the Melkite Church between the Melkite Greek Catholic Church and the Eastern Orthodox Church of Antioch.

Jeremias imposed austerity at the expense of the Patriarchate, thus managing to reduce debt and improve its financial situation.

Notes

1735 deaths
1650s births
People from Patmos
18th-century Ecumenical Patriarchs of Constantinople